Adriana Rodrigues Orem (born 9 May 1992) is a Portuguese soccer player.

Life

Early life 
Rodrigues was born in Florida to a Portuguese father and Brazilian mother. Adriana's sister Andrea Rodrigues is also a Portuguese international soccer player.

Career

National 
Rodrigues started her career for Clearwater Chargers, played later than with Strictly Soccer Club, Countryside Lightning and another eight years for Clearwater. She played besides four year from 2005 until 2009, for St. Petersburg Devils the St. Petersburg High School. 2010 went for Studies to Florida who played for the Florida Gators and later 3 years for Jacksonville Dolphins. Shortly after graduating from Jacksonville University in December 2013 with a degree in communications, Rodrigues agreed a contract with FC Neunkirch of the Swiss Nationalliga A. After two and a half year left Swiss side Neunkirch and signed in the Homeland of her father Portugal by Sporting Clube de Braga. After one year who played 15 games for SC Braga in the  joined to Hungary top-tier club Győri ETO FC.

International 
She played for Brazil in the 2008 South American Under-17 Women's Football Championship, but switched her allegiance to Portugal and made her senior national team debut on 17 September 2011 against Armenia women's national football team, in 8:0 win.

References

External links
 CWF profile

1992 births
Living people
Portuguese women's footballers
Portugal women's international footballers
Brazilian women's footballers
American women's soccer players
Portuguese people of Brazilian descent
Brazilian people of Portuguese descent
American people of Portuguese descent
American sportspeople of Brazilian descent
Expatriate women's footballers in Switzerland
Florida Gators women's soccer players
Jacksonville University alumni
Jacksonville Dolphins women's soccer players
FC Neunkirch players
Expatriate women's footballers in Hungary
Women's association football midfielders
S.C. Braga (women's football) players
Campeonato Nacional de Futebol Feminino players
American emigrants to Portugal
Sportspeople from St. Petersburg, Florida
Soccer players from Florida